A twinless twin, or lone twin, is a person whose twin has died. Twinless twins around the world unite through organizations and online groups to share support and the status as a twinless twin.

Triplets, quadruplets and higher order multiples can also experience this sort of loss.

Notable twinless twins
Philip K. Dick, American science fiction author whose twin sister, Jane, died when the twins were five weeks old. The loss of his twin is said to have profoundly affected his writing.
Jarosław Kaczyński, former Prime Minister of Poland and identical twin brother of former Polish President Lech Kaczyński, who died in the 2010 Polish Air Force Tu-154 crash.
Marlon Jackson, American singer, dancer and member of The Jackson 5. His twin brother Brandon died shortly after birth.
David Jason, British Actor. His twin brother died at birth.
Jay Kay, British singer and frontman of acid jazz band Jamiroquai, twin brother died several weeks after birth.
Liberace, classically trained pianist and comedian known for his elaborate costumes (the entertainer was known to have counseled the young Elvis on being a twinless twin and the desire to "live for two").
Chuck Panozzo, member of Styx. His fraternal twin brother and bandmate John Panozzo died of cirrhosis of the liver in 1996.
Elvis Presley, pioneering rock musician (twin brother Jesse Garon Presley was stillborn).
Solomon "Shazam" Conner, member of H-Town. His twin brother and bandmate Keven "Dino" Conner was killed in an automobile accident in 2003.
Sophie Turner, British actress who starred in Game of Thrones revealed that she had a twin who died during pregnancy.
Angel Carter, fraternal twin sister of child pop singer Aaron Carter. Aaron died at 34 on November 5, 2022.

References

External links
 Twinless Twins Support Group International
 Lone Twin Network (UK)

Twin
Death